KW is the third studio album by American singer Keith Washington. It was released by Silas Records on March 10, 1998. His debut with the label, it reached number 27 on the US Top R&B/Hip-Hop Albums chart.

Critical reception

In his review for AllMusic, editor Alex Henderson felt that "containing mostly ballads and slow jams, the CD is very much in the late '90s neo-soul vein – the production is high-tech and hip-hop-ish, but the singing is classic R&B. Washington often brings to mind Alexander O'Neal, and he also shows an awareness of Luther Vandross and Freddie Jackson. A few of the tracks are excellent [...] most of the other material, however, is decent, although not remarkable. But while KW isn't the all-out gem that Washington is quite capable of providing, it was still nice to see him recording again." Billboard found that with KW "Washington brings his no-nonsense ballads and think-on-it, midtempo tracks to the table [...] It will be interesting to see how [he] fares against such other balladeers as R. Kelly and Maxwell."

Track listing

Notes
 denotes co-producer
 denotes additional producer

Charts

References 

1998 albums